New York Bus Service was a private bus company in New York City, United States. Originally a school bus company founded in the mid-1940s, it was best known for providing express bus service between Midtown Manhattan and eastern sections of the Bronx from 1970 until July 1, 2005, when the city (MTA) assumed the company's operations from longtime owner Edward Arrigoni. Former NYBS routes currently operate under the MTA Bus Company brand of the Metropolitan Transportation Authority, out of the former NYBS facility in Eastchester, Bronx.

History
The company began as the "station wagons-for-hire" business of Ferdinand E. Arrigoni. It was officially founded in either 1944 or 1945 under the name Parochial Bus Service to provide school bus service. It began operating racetrack services from the Bronx and Upper Manhattan in 1949, then operating as New York Bus Tours. In 1964, contemporary owner Edward F. Arrigoni took over the company after the death of his father. The company later operated service to the 1964 New York World's Fair (under the subsidiary Ferdinand Arrigoni, Inc.) and to New York Mets games at Shea Stadium beginning in 1966, both from the George Washington Bridge Bus Station in Washington Heights, Manhattan. The Shea Stadium service would also operate from Fordham Plaza, Parkchester, and several other locations in the Bronx. By 1968, the company began operating under the name New York Bus Service.

With the institution of off-track betting legislation in 1970, the demand for transportation to the race track diminished. New York Bus Service needed to find another niche in the bus transportation sector. Under the leadership of owner Edward Arrigoni, New York Bus Service commenced Parkchester - Manhattan express bus service (now the BxM6) on August 24, 1970. Six more lines were added including a Co-Op City to Wall Street express bus service, later to be done away with. These express bus routes would run frequently during AM and PM peak periods.

New York Bus Service also previously operated two local bus routes in 1968 from Co-op City to the Wakefield–241st Street station via Baychester Av. (Bx71), and from Co-op City to the Eastchester–Dyre Avenue station (Bx70). Both of these routes were discontinued in 1972 due to low ridership.

New York Bus Service designed the standard New York City Department of Transportation Private Lines driver badges and discovered ways of reducing rollsign wear.

City takeover and current status
As part of a major takeover of the remaining private bus operators, on March 23, 2005 the city of New York announced it had agreed to take over NYBS operations. The city made an initial buyout payment of two million dollars for rights to the Bronx express bus lines NYBS operated. The MTA Bus Company (the successor to the private line operations) meanwhile agreed to pay Arrigoni and the other NYBS owners six million dollars annually for use of its depot and maintenance facilities for a period of twenty years, with an option to purchase afterwards. On July 1, 2005, NYBS ceased operations and the former bus routes began operating under MTA Bus. The MTA has since renamed the garage to Eastchester Depot. The large facility currently provides heavy maintenance services, along with a body shop for collision rebuilding and repairs for many MTA, and NYCT buses, stores "system reserve" buses, and handles much of the scrapping duties, including usable parts removal with components salvage and removal operations from all retired buses.

Bus routes
Prior to the MTA Bus takeover, New York Bus Service operated the following express bus routes with starting dates:

References

Iona College Honors Edward Arrigonni as an Alumni
National Bus Trader April 1985 Issue

External links
New York Bus Service at nybus.com (available via the Internet Archive)
New York Bus Tours/New York Bus Service (BusTalk U.S. Surface Transportation Galleries)

Bus transportation in New York City
Defunct public transport operators in the United States
American companies disestablished in 2005
American companies established in 1944
Transport companies established in 1944
1944 establishments in New York City
2005 disestablishments in New York (state)